Hello, Bookstore is a 2022 documentary film. The film tells the  story of "The Bookstore" in Lenox, Massachusetts.

References

External links
 Hello, Bookstore

2022 documentary films